Sarcolobus is a plant genus in the family Apocynaceae, first described as a genus in 1810. It is native to Southeast Asia, New Guinea, Australia, and certain islands of the Western Pacific.

Species
 Sarcolobus brachystephanus (Schltr.) P.I.Forst. - New Guinea
 Sarcolobus hullsii (F.Muell. ex Benth.) P.I.Forst. - Australia
 Sarcolobus kaniensis (Schltr.) P.I.Forst. - New Guinea
 Sarcolobus secamonoides (Schltr.) P.I.Forst. - New Guinea
 Sarcolobus spanoghei Miq. - Java
 Sarcolobus sulphureus (Volkens) Schltr. -  Caroline Islands in Micronesia

References

External links 

Asclepiadoideae
Apocynaceae genera